Japanese singer Shizuka Kudo has released eighteen studio albums, fourteen compilation albums, one EP, two cover albums, six video albums, twelve live video albums, two box sets, and forty-three singles (including one as a featured artist and one novelty single). Her career began in 1985 when she debuted as one of the three vocalists of the girl group Seventeen Club. The short-lived group disbanded after two unsuccessful singles. In 1986, she joined the idol girl group Onyanko Club as member number 38, which led to Kudo forming the subgroup Ushirogami Hikaretai the following year. She released her first solo single, "Kindan no Telepathy", on the same day as the last broadcast of the variety show Yūyake Nyan Nyan, from which the Onyanko Club members originated. It debuted at number one on the Oricon Singles Chart and became the first of eleven total number-one singles released in the late 1980s and early 1990s, including "Koi Hitoyo", "Arashi no Sugao", "Kuchibiru Kara Biyaku", "Senryū no Shizuku" and "Please". Miyuki Nakajima penned the following singles released by Kudo during this era: "Fu-ji-tsu", "Mugon... Iroppoi", "Kōsa ni Fukarete", "Watashi ni Tsuite" and Dōkoku". All five singles debuted at number one and, with total sales exceeding a million, "Dōkoku" became the best-selling single of Kudo's career.

In 1994, Kudo parted ways with record producer Tsugutoshi Gotō, who had been responsible for writing and producing her songs since her solo debut, and began producing and co-writing her own material. That year, she released the album Expose, which produced the two top-ten singles "Blue Rose" and "Jaguar Line", and branched out into different musical genres and a more mature sound with the subsequent self-produced albums, Purple, Doing and Dress. She teamed up with Nakajima on the single, "Gekijō", the first of Kudo's songs to be written entirely by Nakajima, which became her best-selling single not produced by Gotō. In 1998, she released I'm Not, entirely written and produced by Sharam Q guitarist Hatake, which yielded the Dragon Ball GT ending theme "Blue Velvet". The same year she released "Kirara", which ranked at number six on the Oricon Singles Chart, becoming her last single to peak in the top-ten.

In 2000, Kudo signed with Extasy Japan, founded by Yoshiki, who produced her first single released under the label, "Shinku no Hana". Two years later, after the birth of her first child, she went on to release her only studio album for the label, Jewelry Box. Kudo rejoined Pony Canyon, her former label, in 2005, for which she released her first album in three years, Tsukikage. She released a slew of singles, compilation albums and a cover album in the following years. In 2017, in celebration of her 30th anniversary, Kudo released Rin, her first studio album in twelve years. It debuted at number 21 on the Oricon Albums Chart, becoming her highest-charting album in nineteen years. As of August 2013, Kudo has sold 15 million records as a solo artist in Japan alone, making her one of the best-selling Japanese music artists of all time.

Albums

Studio albums

Cover albums

Compilation albums

Extended plays

Box sets

Singles

As lead artist

As featured artist

Other appearances

Footnotes

References

External links
 Official website
 Shizuka Kudo at AllMusic
 
 

Discography
Discographies of Japanese artists
Pop music discographies